School for Danger (also known as Now It Can Be Told) is a 1947 British docudrama film directed by  Teddy Baird depicting the training and deployment of agents of the Special Operations Executive during the Second World War. The film stars real-life SOE agents Captain Harry Rée and Jacqueline Nearne.

Premise
In 1943, "Captain Brown" and "Miss Williams" are recruited and trained to be secret agents (Miss Williams as Brown's wireless operator). They are then sent to German-occupied France, under the operational names "Felix" and "Cat", where they organise resistance, carrying out sabotage and helping airmen get back to the UK.

Main cast
 Captain Harry Rée as Captain Brown / "Felix"
 Jacqueline Nearne as Miss Williams / "Cat"

References

External links
 

1947 films
British black-and-white films
British spy films
Films set in 1943
Films set in France
World War II spy films
1947 documentary films
British documentary films
1940s English-language films
1940s British films